Statistics of Japanese Regional Leagues for the 2010 season.

Hokkaido

2010 was the 33rd season of Hokkaido League. The season started on May 16 and ended on September 19.

It was contested by six teams and Sapporo University GP won the tournament for the second consecutive year.

After the season, Blackpecker Hakodate and Sapporo Winds were to be relegated to the Block Leagues, however, finally only Sapporo Winds was relegated because the number of teams was expanded to 8 from 2011 season.

League table

Results

Tohoku

Division 1
2010 was the 34th season of Tohoku League. The season started on April 11 and ended on October 17.

It was contested by eight teams and Grulla Morioka won the championship for the fourth consecutive year. In the repetition of the previous season, they outstripped Fukushima United only by the goal difference.

Cobaltore Onagawa were relegated and Division 2 play-off winner Fuji Club 2003 took their place.

League table

Results

Division 2
2010 was the 14th season of Tohoku League Division 2. North and South groups were won by Fuji Club 2003 and Scheinen Fukushima respectively, and in post-season playoff series the former earned promotion to Division 1.

North league table

North league results

South league table

South league results

Tohoku promotion and relegation series
To decide the promotion between the two divisions, the Division 2 winners played against each other in a two-legged series. Fuji Club 2003 defeated Scheinen Fukushima and gained direct promotion to Division 1, replacing the bottom-placed Cobaltore Onagawa, while Scheinen Fukushima faced the seventh placed team in Division 1 Shiogama Wiese in another two-legged series. Shiogama Wiese won the series 6–4 on aggregate (winning 5–1 away and losing 2–3 at home) and they remained in Division 1.

Kanto

Division 1

2010 was the 44th season of Kanto League. The season started on April 4 and ended on August 1.

It was contested by eight teams. YSCC Yokohama won the championship for the second consecutive year (third title overall).

After the season, Club Dragons and AC Almaleza were relegated to the second division. Because of the relegation of Ryutsu Keizai University from Japan Football League, only the champions of Division 2, Toho Titanium, were promoted.

League table

Results

Division 2
2010 was the 8th season of Kanto League Division 2. It was won by Toho Titanium who earned promotion to Division 1. On the other end of the table, Honda Luminozo Sayama were relegated to prefectural leagues.

League table

Results

Hokushin'etsu

Division 1

2010 was the 36th season of Hokushin'etsu League. The season started on April 11 and ended on September 19.

It was contested by eight teams and Nagano Parceiro won the championship for the third time in their history after one-year pause. After the season they won the promotion to Japan Football League.

Because of Parceiro being promoted to JFL, only Antelope Shiojiri were relegated. They were replaced by Division 2 champions and runners-up, Artista Tomi and Fukui KSC respectively.

League table

Results

Division 2

2010 was the 7th season of Hokushin'etsu League Division 2. It was won by the rookies Artista Tomi who thus have won back-to-back promotion along with the runners-up Fukui KSC.

Because only one team was relegated from Division 1, only the bottom placed Ohara Gakuen HS were relegated to Prefectural leagues. They were replaced by Toyama Shinjo Club and AS Jamineiro.

League table

Results

Tokai

Division 1

Division 2

Kansai

Division 1

Division 2

Chugoku

Shikoku

Kyushu

Regional League promotion series

2010
4